The Uzola, also spelled as Usola (Узола, Усола in Russian) is a river in Nizhny Novgorod Oblast in Russia. It is a left tributary of the Volga. The Uzola freezes up in November and stays under the ice until April.

References 

Rivers of Nizhny Novgorod Oblast